is a train station in Gose, Nara Prefecture, Japan.

Lines 
 Kintetsu Railway
 Yoshino Line

Platforms and tracks

Connections
 Gose City Community Bus
 for Kintetsu Gose Station, and Kazenomori Tōge

Surrounding Area

External links

References

Railway stations in Japan opened in 1923
Railway stations in Nara Prefecture